Giovanni L. Palandrani (born February 12, 1996), better known by his stage name Aquaria, is an American drag queen, television personality, and recording artist best known for winning the tenth season of RuPaul's Drag Race in 2018.

Early life and education
Palandrani was born in West Chester, Pennsylvania to Gina and David Palandrani, has a sister named Francesca, and is of Italian descent. He trained as a dancer for four years and experimented with drag in high school. He attended the Fashion Institute of Technology in Manhattan for two semesters, studying women's wear design, before dropping out.

Career

Aquaria is the drag daughter of Drag Race season four winner Sharon Needles. However, after accusations of abuse were made against Needles in 2020, Aquaria has said that she "does not support him" and "feels awful for anyone he has hurt". She began performing in drag in 2014. Like RuPaul, Aquaria received early support from Susanne Bartsch. Aquaria was featured in a Vogue Italia spread in January 2016 with Bartsch and other Drag Race alumnae.

In early 2018, it was announced that Aquaria was chosen as one of fourteen contestants for the tenth season of RuPaul's Drag Race, upon her first audition for the program. She won three main challenges, never ranked in the bottom two, and was the first queen in the show's history to win both the ball and the "Snatch Game" in the same season. Aquaria was announced as the winner of the season on June 28, 2018, beating out Eureka O'Hara and Kameron Michaels in the final three.

Aquaria was nominated with Miz Cracker for the "Competition Contestant of 2018" for the 2018 People's Choice Awards.

In October 2018, Aquaria appeared solo in an issue of Vogue Italia, photographed by Michael Bailey-Gates. She was a model for Moschino and H&M's November 2018 Capsule Collection with Bria Vinaite and Jeremy Scott. She received a contract from IMG Models, and was announced as the Entertainment editor for Dazed.

In 2019, Aquaria was announced as one of the faces of MAC's Viva Glam campaign. She attended the 2019 Met Gala, and was the first drag queen to walk the red carpet. In June 2019, a panel of judges from New York magazine placed her 11th on their list of "the most powerful drag queens in America", a ranking of 100 former Drag Race contestants.

In 2019, Aquaria released her very own makeup palette in collaboration with NYX Cosmetics.

In September 2019, at RuPaul's DragCon NYC, Aquaria was named as one of a rotating cast of a dozen Drag Race queens in RuPaul's Drag Race Live!, a Las Vegas show residency from January to August 2020 at the  Flamingo Las Vegas.

Aquaria performed as a part of Rihanna's Savage X Fenty Beauty Fashion Show during the Fall 2019 New York Fashion Week.

Music

As part of the final challenge of season 10, Aquaria and the other top four contestants wrote and recorded their own verses for RuPaul's song "American." The song reached number 12 on the Billboard Dance/Electronic Songs chart. Aquaria was featured in the song "Looks" by Linux in 2016. He released his debut single, "Burn Rubber", in June 2018. The song was written by Jesse Saint John.

Personal life
Aquaria lives in Brooklyn, New York City.

On July 3, 2018, singer Bebe Rexha criticized Aquaria and the other Drag Race top four queens over Twitter for supposed bad behavior toward her at the VH1 Trailblazer Honors, such as not talking to her and being "cold". Aquaria responded with a series of tweets defending herself and her fellow queens.

In May 2018, Aquaria criticized rapper Travis Scott for removing Amanda Lepore, a transgender woman, from the cover art of his 2018 album Astroworld.

Discography

As lead artist

As featured artist

Filmography

Television

Music videos

Internet series

Awards and nominations

See also
 LGBT culture in New York City
 List of LGBT people from New York City

References

External links

 

1996 births
Living people
American drag queens
American people of Italian descent
Gay entertainers
LGBT people from New York (state)
LGBT people from Pennsylvania
People from Brooklyn
People from West Chester, Pennsylvania
RuPaul's Drag Race winners
Shorty Award winners
Fashion Institute of Technology alumni